This is a list of Western Oregon Wolves players in the NFL Draft.

Key

Selections

References

Lists of National Football League draftees by college football team

Western Oregon Wolves NFL Draft